Schilling may refer to:
 Schilling (unit), an historical unit of measurement
 Schilling (coin), the historical European coin
 Austrian schilling, the former currency of Austria
 A. Schilling & Company, an historical West Coast spice firm acquired in 1948 by McCormick & Company
 Schilling Air Force Base
 Schilling Power Station, an oil-fired power station near the nuclear power station at Stade, Germany
 Schilling of Solothurn, a family of two Swiss chroniclers
 The Schilling School for Gifted Children, a K-12 school in Cincinnati, Ohio

People
 Schilling (surname)

See also 
 Schilling test in medicine
 Shilling
 Schillings, a firm of UK lawyers
 Schillings (surname)
 Skilling (currency)